This is a list of video games by Capcom organized alphabetically by name. The list may also include ports that were developed and published by others companies under license from Capcom.

References